Kolton Alan Kohl (born May 6, 1998) is an American basketball player. He played college basketball for the Abilene Christian Wildcats.

High school career
Kohl attended Central High School in San Angelo, Texas. He grew six inches (0.15 m) in his final three years of high school. Kohl was a First Team All-District 3-6A selection and district Defensive MVP.

College career
Prior to his first season at Abilene Christian, Kohl suffered a torn anterior cruciate ligament in his right knee during a summer workout. Following surgery, he developed a bacterial blood infection in his knee. He recovered after three months, losing about 20 lbs (9.1 kg) during that time, and was granted a redshirt. In his first two years, Kohl received limited playing time, before entering the starting lineup in his junior season. As a junior, he averaged 9.6 points and 4.3 rebounds per game. In his senior season, Kohl earned First Team All-Southland honors and led his team to a 2021 Southland tournament title, being named to the All-Tournament Team. In the first round of the 2021 NCAA tournament, he helped 14th-seeded Abilene Christian achieve a 53–52 win over third-seeded Texas.

Career statistics

College

|-
| style="text-align:left;"| 2016–17
| style="text-align:left;"| Abilene Christian
| style="text-align:center;" colspan="11"|  Redshirt
|-
| style="text-align:left;"| 2017–18
| style="text-align:left;"| Abilene Christian
| 25 || 0 || 4.2 || .417 || – || .500 || .9 || .1 || .0 || .4 || 1.6
|-
| style="text-align:left;"| 2018–19
| style="text-align:left;"| Abilene Christian
| 31 || 5 || 4.6 || .462 || – || .657 || 1.6 || .2 || .2 || .4 || 1.9
|-
| style="text-align:left;"| 2019–20
| style="text-align:left;"| Abilene Christian
| 31 || 20 || 17.9 || .535 || .000 || .717 || 4.3 || .8 || .5 || .8 || 9.6
|-
| style="text-align:left;"| 2020–21
| style="text-align:left;"| Abilene Christian
| 29 || 29 || 18.7 || .540 || .267 || .716 || 4.8 || 1.4 || .4 || .9 || 11.9
|- class="sortbottom"
| style="text-align:center;" colspan="2"| Career
| 116 || 54 || 11.6 || .524 || .211 || .693 || 3.0 || .6 || .3 || .6 || 6.4

References

External links
Abilene Christian Wildcats bio

1998 births
Living people
American men's basketball players
Basketball players from Texas
People from San Angelo, Texas
Abilene Christian Wildcats men's basketball players
Centers (basketball)